The Ubangian languages form a diverse linkage of some seventy languages centered on the Central African Republic. They are the predominant languages of the CAR, spoken by 2–3 million people, and include the national language, Sango. They are also spoken in Cameroon, Chad, the DR Congo, and South Sudan.

External classification
Joseph Greenberg (1963) classified the then-little-known Ubangian languages as Niger–Congo and placed them within the Adamawa languages as "Eastern Adamawa". They were soon removed to a separate branch of Niger–Congo, for example within Blench's Savanna languages. However, this has become increasingly uncertain, and Dimmendaal (2008) states that, based on the lack of convincing evidence for a Niger–Congo classification ever being produced, Ubangian "probably constitutes an independent language family that cannot or can no longer be shown to be related to Niger–Congo (or any other family)." Blench (2012) includes Ubangian within Niger–Congo. Güldemann (2018) notes that although evidence for the inclusion of Ubangi within Niger-Congo is still weak, the same also applies to many other branches which are uncontested members of Niger-Congo.

Internal classification
Boyd and Moñino (2010) removed the Gbaya and Zande languages. The half dozen remaining branches are coherent, but their interrelationships are not straightforward. Williamson & Blench (2000) propose the following arrangement:

In addition there is the Ngombe language, whose placement is uncertain due to a paucity of data. 

Note: The ambiguous name Ngbaka is used for various languages in the area. Generally, singular Ngbaka language refers to one of the main Gbaya languages, whereas plural Ngbaka languages refers to a branch of Ubangian.

Güldemann (2018)
Güldemann (2018) recognises seven coherent "genealogical units" within Ubangian, but is agnostic about their positions within Niger–Congo.

Gbayaic
Zandic
Mbaic
Mundu-Baka
Ngbandic
Bandaic
Ndogoic

Comparative vocabulary
Sample basic vocabulary of Ubangian languages from Moñino (1988):

Numerals
Comparison of numerals in individual languages:

References 

 
Niger–Congo languages
Proposed language families
Unclassified languages of Africa